Maryland's Legislative District 36 is one of 47 districts in the state for the Maryland General Assembly. It covers Kent County, Queen Anne's County, and parts of Caroline County and Cecil County.

Demographic characteristics
As of the 2020 United States census, the district had a population of 129,429, of whom 101,733 (78.6%) were of voting age. The racial makeup of the district was 103,031 (79.6%) White, 11,859 (9.2%) African American, 414 (0.3%) Native American, 1,613 (1.2%) Asian, 40 (0.0%) Pacific Islander, 4,190 (3.2%) from some other race, and 8,282 (6.4%) from two or more races. Hispanic or Latino of any race were 8,428 (6.5%) of the population.

The district had 90,062 registered voters as of October 17, 2020, of whom 17,728 (19.7%) were registered as unaffiliated, 41,025 (45.6%) were registered as Republicans, 29,927 (33.2%) were registered as Democrats, and 766 (0.9%) were registered to other parties.

Political representation
The district is represented for the 2023–2027 legislative term in the State Senate by Stephen S. Hershey Jr. (R) and in the House of Delegates by Steven J. Arentz (R), Jefferson L. Ghrist (R) and Jay A. Jacobs (R).

History

1994 redistricting
On January 14, 1994, Maryland was ordered to submit a plan for a new African American majority district on the Eastern Shore following Marylanders for Fair Representation, Inc. v. Schaefer. The U.S. District Court approved a plan to alter the boundaries of former legislative districts 36, 37, and 38, beginning with the 1994 general election. Following this plan, Kent County, Queen Anne's County and parts of Caroline County, Cecil County and Talbot County were provisioned for district 36.

References

Kent County, Maryland
Queen Anne's County, Maryland
Caroline County, Maryland
Cecil County, Maryland
36
36